James Lee Anderson (born July 24, 1948) is an American politician and a Republican member of the Wyoming Senate representing District 28 since January 7, 2013.

During the 2012 presidential election he and Eli Bebout served as co-chairs of Mitt Romney's presidential campaign in Wyoming.

Education
Anderson graduated from Kaycee High School in 1966 and earned his AS from Casper College.

Elections
 2012 Anderson challenged incumbent Republican Senator Kit Jennings in the three-way August 21, 2012 Republican Primary, winning with 928 votes (51.2%), and won the November 6, 2012 General election with 4,560 votes (60.5%) against Democratic nominee Kim Holloway.

References

External links
 Official page at the Wyoming Legislature
 
 Biography at Ballotpedia
 Financial information (state office) at the National Institute for Money in State Politics

1948 births
Living people
Casper College alumni
Politicians from Casper, Wyoming
People from Sheridan, Wyoming
Republican Party Wyoming state senators
21st-century American politicians
United States Army soldiers
United States Army personnel of the Vietnam War